The 2003/04 FIS Nordic Combined World Cup was the 21st World Cup season, organized by the International Ski Federation. It started on 29 November 2003 in Kuusamo, Finland and ended on 6 March 2004 in Lahti, Finland.

Calendar

Men

Team

Standings

Overall 

Standings after 19 events.

Sprint 

Standings after 8 events.

Warsteiner Grand Prix 

Standings after 3 events.

Nations Cup 

Standings after 22 events.

References

External links
FIS Nordic Combined World Cup 2003/04 

2003 in Nordic combined
2004 in Nordic combined
FIS Nordic Combined World Cup